The Church of la Asunción (Spanish: Iglesia Arciprestal de la Asunción) is a Roman Catholic church located in Almansa, province of Albacete Spain.

Construction of the church at this site in the then-expanding town was chosen in 1524. A number of architects including maestro Marquina, Maestro Pedro, Maestro Juan de Aranguren, Juanes de Segura, and Juan de Urrea took the work to 1579. The late-Renaissance portal has a relief depicting the Annunciation and Assumption of the Virgin. The façade was started in 1619-1624 by Francisco de Figuerola. Work continued on the sacristy, various chapels, and the bell-tower into the later half of the 18th century. From 1789 to 1805, Bartolomé Rivelles worked on the apse. The interior was decorated in Neoclassical style. Restoration took place in the 1980s.

It was declared Bien de Interés Cultural in 1983.

References 

Asuncion (Almansa)
Bien de Interés Cultural landmarks in the Province of Albacete
Renaissance architecture in Castilla–La Mancha
16th-century Roman Catholic church buildings in Spain
Almansa